Joseph Tellechéa (27 November 1926 – 16 December 2015) was a French football midfielder who played for FC Sochaux-Montbéliard and RC Franc-Comtois.

References

External links
 

1926 births
2015 deaths
French footballers
France international footballers
Association football midfielders
Ligue 1 players
Ligue 2 players
FC Sochaux-Montbéliard players